Showing Suite is web-based software that real estate agents, brokers, and home sellers use to automate the showing feedback process and schedule showing appointments. Located in San Diego, California, Showing Suite was incorporated in 2001 under the name HomeFeedback by founders Rick Bengson and Alan Shafran. Currently, Showing Suite is active in the United States and Canada.

Showing Suite has produced a suite of software for real estate professionals including HomeFeedback, Home Followup, Showing Sync, Showing Calendar, Foreclosure Feedback.

History
Prior to starting Showing Suite, Founder and CEO Rick Bengson was president of RealPro Real Estate Consultants Inc. He earned his bachelor’s degree in computer science from Northern Illinois University. Following his undergraduate studies, Rick attended the Thomas Jefferson School of Law.

Co-founder and president Alan Shafran also currently heads The Alan Shafran Group, a team of Prudential real estate agents in San Diego. Previously, Shafran worked for the investment company, PaineWebber.

Shafran and Bengson wrote and published their book, Blueprint For 100 Deals, which was released in June 2011.

Showing Suite was acquired by ShowingTime in January 2017.

Partners
Showing Suite and electronic lockbox provider SentriLock integrated systems in November 2010.
Showing Suite's other direct partners are Keller Williams Realty, Exit Realty, Assist2Sell, and Realty Executives.

References

Real estate companies established in 2001
Online real estate databases